Chhuxlla Willk'i (Aymara chhuxlla grass, weed, pasture or a kind of barley, willk'i gap, "pasture gap" or "barley gap", also spelled Chojlla Willkhi) is a  mountain in the Chilla-Kimsa Chata mountain range in the Andes of Bolivia. It lies in the La Paz Department, Ingavi Province, Jesús de Machaca Municipality. Chhuxlla Willk'i is situated south-east of the  mountain named Qala Cruz (Khala Cruz) and  Ch'alla Qullu ("sand mountain", Challa Kkollu), and north-east of a  mountain which is also called Qala Cruz.

References 

Mountains of La Paz Department (Bolivia)